Oberstabsarzt (short: OStArzt or OSA) is a military rank in German speaking armed force. It describes a medical staff officer surgeon or medical staff officer dentist comparable to major (de: Major) or lieutenant commander (de: Korvettenkapitän) NATO-Rangcode OF3 in anglophone armed forces.

Germany

Bundeswehr
In the Joint Medical Service of the German Bundeswehr
Oberstabsarzt, Oberstabsapotheker, and Oberstabsveterinär comparable in NATO to the OF-3 ranks Major, and to Korvettenkapitän.

Address
The manner of formal addressing of military surgeons/dentists with the rank Oberstabsarzt is "Herr/Frau Oberstabsarzt", with the rank Oberstabsapotheker, "Herr/Frau Oberstabsapotheker", and veterinaries with the rank Oberstabsveterinär "Herr/Frau Oberstabsveterinär". Although the grammatically female form of Arzt is Ärztin, the military does not have separate gendered ranks, so the correct form of address for a female physician is "Frau Oberstabsarzt".

Rank insignias
On the shoulder straps (Heer, Luftwaffe) there is one silver star in silver oak leaves and the career insignia (de: Laufbahnabzeichen) as symbol of the medical standing, or course of studies. The piping on shoulder straps shows the Waffenfarbe (en: corps- or troop-function colour), corresponding to the appropriate military service, branch, or special force. The corps colour of the "Bundeswehr Joint Medical Service" is dark blue.

In the Marines, the career insignia is in the middle of both sleeves, 3 cm above the cuff strips, and on the shoulder straps between strips and button.

Wehrmacht

Oberstabsarzt of the German Wehrmacht was comparable to the Major / Korvettenkapitän (OF-3), as well as to the Sturmbannführer and Major of the Waffen-SS.

In line to the so-called Reichsbesoldungsordnung (en: Reich's salary order), appendixes to the Salary law of the German Empire (de: Besoldungsgesetz des Deutschen Reiches) of 1927 (changes 1937 – 1940), the comparative ranks were as follows: C 6
Major (Heer and Luftwaffe)
Korvettenkapitän (Kriegsmarine)
Oberstabsarzt (medical service of the Wehrmacht)
Marineoberstabsarzt, introduced June 26, 1935 (medical service of the Kriegsmarine)
Oberstabsveterinär (veterinarian service of the Wehrmacht)

During wartime, regular assignments of Oberstabsarzt were commander of a medical company, or chief of a, field-, evacuation-, or war hospital (de. Feldlazarett / Kreislazarett). However, a field hospital could be managed by an Oberfeldarzt (OF4) as well. An Oberstabsarzt was assisted by first lieutenants (Dr.), second lieutenants (Dr.), and help surgeons (de: Ober-, Assistenz-, and Hilfsärzte).

The corps colour of the military Health Service Support (HSS) in German armed forces was traditional dark blue, and of the veterinarian service . This tradition was continued by the medical service corps in Heer and Luftwaffe of the Reichswehr and Wehrmacht.

Kriegsmarine 
Rank designations of the Kriegsmarine as to Match 30, 1934, are contained in the table below.

Austria-Hungary
In the Austria-Hungarian Common Army (de: Gemeinsame Armee or k.u.k. Armee) there was the OF3-rank Stabsarzt (en: Staff surgeon) until 1918, equivalent to the OF3-rank Oberstabsarzt in Germany. That particular rank was comparable to the Major OF3-rank as well.

References

Military ranks of Germany
Military of Austria
Austro-Hungarian Army